Soco Gap (el. ) is a mountain pass between the Plott Balsam Range, to its south, and the Balsam Mountains, to its north. Also known as Ahalunun'yi, meaning "Ambush Place" or Uni'halu'na, meaning "where they ambushed;" named after the occasion, probably in the mid 1700s, when the Cherokees ambushed a party of invading Shawnees, all of which were killed except for one, who was sent back (without his ears) to tell his people of the Cherokee victory.

The gap is the eastern point of the Qualla Boundary, which marks the territory held as a land trust for the federally recognized Eastern Band of Cherokee Indians. The gap also separates Haywood and Jackson counties and separates the river basins to the French Broad River and Little Tennessee.

U.S. Route 19 (Soco Road) traverses through the gap, which connects Cherokee and Maggie Valley. The Blue Ridge Parkway also passes through the gap, providing scenic views along the adjacent ridge lines.

References

External links 

Landforms of Haywood County, North Carolina
Landforms of Jackson County, North Carolina
Mountain passes of North Carolina
Transportation in Haywood County, North Carolina
Transportation in Jackson County, North Carolina
Blue Ridge Parkway
U.S. Route 19